Nicrophorus pustulatus is a burying beetle described by Johann Karl Wilhelm Illiger in 1808.

Behavior
While N. pustulatus is capable of using carrion to feed its larvae (as in other species of Nicrophorus), it is the only species in the genus thus far shown to be able to use other food resources; in this case, the females can raise their brood on snake eggs.

See Also
Egg predation

References

Silphidae
Beetles of North America
Beetles described in 1807